Harbour or Seascape (Spanish - Marina) is a small 1881 oil on canvas painting by Joaquín Sorolla, early in his career. It is now in the Sorolla Museum in Madrid.

It follows the Spanish academic style of the late 19th century, influenced by the central European post-romantic tradition of seascapes and by the Valencian pilot, archaeologist and painter Rafael Monleón y Torres.

References

1881 paintings
Paintings by Joaquín Sorolla
Paintings in the collection of the Sorolla Museum